Rodney James Tucker (born 28 August 1964) is an Australian cricket umpire, member of the ICC Elite Umpire Panel and officiates in international Tests, ODIs and T20Is. He was a cricketer who played briefly for New South Wales from 1985/86 to 1987/88, before moving to Tasmania where he played from 1987/88 to 1998/99. He was also vice-captain of Tasmania from 1991/92 until 1995/96. He briefly played as Captain/Coach for the Canberra Comets in the 1999/2000 season before retiring from cricket as a player.

Playing career
A left-handed batsman, Tucker scored 5,076 first-class runs at an average of 36.25, and took 123 first class wickets at an average of 41.40, bowling right arm medium. He played in Tasmania's sides that were runners-up in the Sheffield Shield in 1993–94 and 1997–98.

Umpiring career
After his playing career, Tucker took to umpiring.  He was appointed to the ICC International Panel of Umpires in 2008 and was quickly promoted to the ICC Elite Umpire Panel in 2010. He was selected as one of the twenty umpires to stand in matches during the 2015 Cricket World Cup. Tucker stood in the 1st semi-final of the tournament played between South Africa and New Zealand on 24 March 2015 at Auckland. He stood in the final of the 2016 ICC World Twenty20. On 2 January 2017, he stood in his 50th Test, when umpiring the second Test between South Africa and Sri Lanka at Newlands Cricket Ground.

In April 2019, he was named as one of the sixteen umpires to stand in matches during the 2019 Cricket World Cup.

See also
 List of Test cricket umpires
 List of One Day International cricket umpires
 List of Twenty20 International cricket umpires

References

External links

1964 births
Living people
New South Wales cricketers
ACT Comets cricketers
Tasmania cricketers
Australian Test cricket umpires
Australian One Day International cricket umpires
Australian Twenty20 International cricket umpires
Australian cricketers
Sportsmen from New South Wales
Cricketers from Sydney